The Eureka Rebellion was a series of events involving gold miners who revolted against the British administration of the colony of Victoria, Australia during the Victorian gold rush. It culminated in the Battle of the Eureka Stockade, which took place on 3 December 1854 at Ballarat between the rebels and the colonial forces of Australia. The fighting resulted in an official total of 27 deaths and many injuries, the majority of casualties being rebels. There was a preceding period beginning in 1851 of peaceful demonstrations and civil disobedience on the Victorian goldfields. The miners had various grievances, chiefly the cost of mining permits and the officious way the system was enforced.

Mass public support led to the acquittal of 13 captured rebels at their high treason trials in Melbourne. Rebel leader Peter Lalor was elected to the parliament, later serving as Speaker of the Victorian Legislative Assembly. Several reforms sought by the rebels were subsequently implemented, including legislation providing for universal adult male suffrage for Legislative Assembly elections and the removal of property qualifications for Legislative Assembly members. The Eureka Rebellion is controversially identified with the birth of democracy in Australia and interpreted by many as a political revolt. There is an interpretive centre at the Eureka Stockade Memorial Park that has as its centrepiece the Eureka Flag, which the miners swore allegiance to and flew over the battle.

Location
In 1931, R.S. Reed claimed that "an old tree stump on the south side of Victoria Street, near Humffray Street, is the historic tree at which the pioneer diggers gathered in the days before the Eureka Stockade to discuss their grievances against the officialdom of the time." Reed called for the formation of a committee of citizens to "beautify the spot, and to preserve the tree stump" upon which Lalor addressed the assembled rebels during the oath swearing ceremony. It was also reported the stump "has been securely fenced in, and the enclosed area is to be planted with floriferous trees. The spot is adjacent to Eureka, which is famed alike for the stockade fight and for the fact that the Welcome Nugget. (sold for £10,500) was discovered in 1858 within a stone's throw of it." A report commissioned by the City of Ballarat in 2015 found that given documentary evidence and its elevation, the most likely location of the oath swearing ceremony is 29 St. Paul's Way, Bakery Hill. As of 2016, the area was a car park awaiting residential development.

The exact site of the Eureka Stockade itself remains unknown. The materials used to build the stockade were rapidly removed to be used for the mines, and the entire surrounding area was so extensively worked that the original landscape became unrecognisable, making identifying the historical location of the stockade virtually impossible. In 1870, Ballarat born historian William Withers claimed that:

History 
Following the separation of Victoria from New South Wales on 1 July 1851, gold prospectors were offered 200 guineas for making discoveries within  of Melbourne. In August 1851, the news was received around the world that, on top of several earlier finds, Thomas Hiscock,  kilometres west of Buninyong, had found still more deposits. This led to gold fever taking hold as the colony's population increased from 77,000 in 1851 to 198,496 in 1853. In three years, the total number of people living in and around the Victorian goldfields stood at a 12-month average of 100,351. Among this number was "a heavy sprinkling of ex-convicts, gamblers, thieves, rogues and vagabonds of all kinds." The local authorities soon found themselves with fewer police and lacked the infrastructure needed to support the expansion of the mining industry. The number of public servants, factory and farm workers leaving for the goldfields to seek their fortune made for chronic labour shortages that needed to be resolved.

Protests on the goldfields: 1851–1854

La Trobe introduces monthly mining tax as protests begin

On 16 August 1851, just days after Hiscock's lucky strike, Lieutenant-Governor Charles La Trobe issued two proclamations that reserved all crown land rights to the goldfields and introduced a mining tax of 30 shillings per month, effective 1 September. The universal mining tax was based on time stayed rather than what was seen as the more equitable option, being an export duty levied only on gold found, meaning it was always designed to make life unprofitable for most prospectors.

There were several mass public meetings and miners' delegations in the years leading up to the armed revolt. The earliest rally was held on 26 August 1851 at Hiscock's Gully in Buninyong and attracted 40-50 miners protesting the new mining regulations, and four resolutions to this end were passed. From the outset, there was a division between the "moral force" activists who favoured lawful, peaceful and democratic means and those who advocated "physical force," with some in attendance suggesting that the miners take up arms against the lieutenant governor, who was irreverently viewed as a feather wearing, effeminate fop. This first meeting was followed by dissent all across the colony's mining settlements.

First gold commissioner arrives in Ballarat

In mid-September 1851, the first gold commissioner appointed by La Trobe arrived in Ballarat. At the beginning of December, there was discontent when it was announced that the licence fee would be raised to 3 pounds a month, effective 1 January 1852. In Ballarat, some miners became so agitated that they began to gather arms. On 8 December, the rebellion continued to build momentum with an anti-mining tax banner put on public display at Forrest Creek. The Forest Creek Monster Meeting took place at Mount Alexander on 15 December 1851. This was the first truly mass demonstration of the Eureka Rebellion; according to high-end estimates, up to 20,000 miners turned out in a massive display of support for repealing the mining tax. Two days later, it was announced that La Trobe had reversed the planned one hundred per cent increase in the mining tax. Nevertheless, the oppressive licence hunts continued and increased in frequency, causing general dissent among the diggers. In addition, there was strong opposition to the strict prohibition of liquor imposed by the government at the goldfields settlements, whereby the sale and consumption of alcohol were restricted to licensed hotels.

Despite the high turnover in population on the goldfields, discontent continued to simmer throughout 1852. On 2 September 1852, La Trobe received a petition from the people of Bendigo, drawing attention to the need for improvements in the road from Melbourne. The lack of police protection was also a major issue for the protesting miners. On 14 August 1852, an affray broke out among 150 men over land rights in Bendigo. An inquiry recommended increasing police numbers in the colony's mining settlements. Around this time, the first gold deposits at the Eureka lead in Ballarat were found. In October 1852, at Lever Flat near Bendigo, the miners attempted to respond to rising crime levels by forming a "Mutual Protection Association." They pledged to withhold the licence fee, build detention centres and commence nightly armed patrols, with privateers dispensing summary justice to those deeply suspected of criminal activities. That month Government House received a petition from Lever Flat, Forrest Creek and Mount Alexander about policing levels as the colony continued to strain due to the gold rush. On 25 November 1852, a police patrol was attacked by a mob of miners who wrongly believed they were obliged to take out a whole month's subscription for seven days at Oven's goldfield in Bendigo.

In 1852, it was decided by the UK government that the Australian colonies should each draft their own constitutions, pending final approval by the Imperial parliament.

Bendigo petition and the Red Ribbon Movement

In 1853 the disquiet on the goldfields continued with public meetings held in Castlemaine, Heathcote and Bendigo. On 3 February 1853, a policeman accidentally caused the death of William Guest at Reid's Creek. Assistant Commissioner James Clow had to diffuse a difficult situation with a promise to conduct an inquiry into the circumstances. A group of one thousand angry miners overran the government camp and relieved the police of their sidearms and weapons, destroying a cache. George Black assisted Dr John Owens in chairing a public meeting held at Ovens field on 11 February 1853 that called for the alleged wrongful death of Guest to be fully investigated.

The Anti-Gold Licence Association was formed in June at a meeting in Bendigo, where 23,000 signatures were collected for a mass petition, including 8,000 from the mining settlement at McIvor.

There was an incident on 2 July 1853 in which police were assaulted in the vicinity of an anti-licence meeting at the Sandhurst goldfield in Bendigo, with rocks being thrown as they escorted an intoxicated miner to the holding cells. On 16 July 1853, an anti-licence demonstration in Sandhurst attracted 6,000 people, who also raised the issue of lack of electoral rights. The high commissioner of the goldfields, William Wright, advised La Trobe of his support for an export duty on gold found rather than the existing universal tax on all prospectors based on time stayed.

On 3 August, the Bendigo petition was placed before La Trobe, who refused to act on a request to suspend the mining tax again and give the miners the right to vote. The next day, there was a meeting held at Protestant Hall in Melbourne where the delegation reported on the exchange with La Trobe. The crowd reacted with "loud disapprobation and showers of hisses" when the lieutenant governor was mentioned. Clark speaks of one of the leaders of the "moral force" faction, George Thompson, who returned to Bendigo, where he attended another meeting on 28 July. Formerly there was very much talk of "moral suasion" and "the genius of the English people to compose their differences without resort to violence." Now the emphasis had shifted to "loyalty." Thompson pointed to the Union Jack and jokingly said that "if the flag went, it would be replaced by a diggers' flag."

The Bendigo "diggers flag" was unfurled at a rally at View Point, Sandhurst, on 12 August. It was reported that the miners paraded under the flags of several nations, including the Irish tricolour, the satire of Scotland, the Union Jack, revolutionary French and German flags, and the Stars and Stripes. The delegates returned from Melbourne with news of the failure of the Bendigo petition. During the winter of 1853, the Red Ribbon Movement was active across the goldfields. Supporters wore red ribbons in their hats and were determined to hand over only 10 shillings for the licence fee and allow the sheer numbers in custody to cause an administrative meltdown. Clark states that:

On 20 August 1853, just as an angry mob of 500-600 miners went to assemble outside the government camp at Waranga, the authorities found a convenient legal technicality to release some mining tax evaders. A meeting in Beechworth called for reducing the licence fee to ten shillings and voting rights for the mining settlements. A larger rally attended by 20,000 people was held at Hospital Hill in Bendigo on 23 August 1853, which resolved to support a mining tariff fixed at 10 shillings a month. There was a second multinational-style assembly at View Point on 27 August. The next day a procession of miners passed by the government camp with the sounds of bands and shouting, and fifty pistol rounds, as an assembly of about 2,000 miners took place. On 29 August 1853, assistant commissioner Robert Rede at Jones Creek, which along with Sandhurst were known hotbeds of activity for the Red Ribbon Movement, counselled that a peaceful, political solution could still be found. In Ballarat, miners offered to surround the guard tent to protect gold reserves amid rumours of a planned robbery.

A sitting of the goldfields committee of the Legislative Council in Melbourne on 6 September 1853 heard from goldfields activists Dr William Carr, W Fraser and William Jones. An Act for the Better Management of the Goldfields was passed, which upon receiving royal assent on 1 December, reduced the licence fee to 40 shillings for every three months. The act featured increasing fines in the order of 5, 10 and 15 pounds for repeat offenders, with goldfields residents required to carry their permits which must be made available for inspection at all times. However, the malcontents welcomed the fee reduction, thereby temporarily relieving tensions in the colony. In November, the select committee bill proposed a licence fee of 1 pound for one month, 2 pounds for three months, 3 for six months and 5 pounds for 12 months, along with extending the franchise and land rights to the miners. La Trobe amended the scheme by increasing the six months licence to 4 pounds, with a fee of 8 pounds for 12 months.

A crowd of 2,000-3,000 attended an anti-licence rally at View Point on 3 December 1853. Once again, on 31 December 1854, about 500 people gathered to elect a so-called "Diggers Congress."

Legislative Council calls for Commission of Inquiry

La Trobe decided to cancel the September 1853 mining tax collections. The Legislative Council supported a Commission of Inquiry into goldfields grievances. It also considered a proposal to abolish the licence fee in return for a royalty on the gold and a nominal charge for maintaining the police service. In November, it was resolved by the Legislative Council that the licence fee be reinstated on a sliding scale of 1 pound per month, 2 pounds per three months, 4 pounds for six months, and 8 pounds for 12 months. License evasion was punishable by increasing fines of 5, 15 and 30 pounds, with serial offenders liable to be sentenced to imprisonment. Licence inspections, treated as a great sport and "carried out in the style of an English fox-hunt" by mounted officials, known to the miners by the warning call "Traps" or "Joes," were henceforth able to take place at any time without notice. The latter sobriquet was a reference to La Trobe, whose proclamations posted around the goldfields were signed and sealed "Walter Joseph Latrobe." Many of the police were former convicts from Tasmania and prone to brutal means. They would get a fifty per cent commission from all fines imposed on unlicensed miners and sly grog sellers. Prohibition was enforced by plainclothes officers, and those involved in the illegal sale of alcohol were initially handed 50-pound fines. However, there was no profit for police from subsequent offences that were instead punishable by months of hard labour. This led to the corrupt practice of police demanding blackmail of 5 pounds from repeat offenders. Miners were arrested for not carrying licences on their person, as they often left them in their tents due to the typically wet and dirty conditions in the mines, then subjected to such indignities as being chained to trees and logs overnight. The impost was most felt by the greater number who were finding the mining tax untenable without any more significant discoveries.

In March 1854, La Trobe sent a reform package to the Legislative Council, which was adopted and sent to London for the approval of the Imperial parliament. The franchise would be extended to all miners upon purchasing a 12-month permit.

Hotham replaces La Trobe

La Trobe's successor as lieutenant-governor, Sir Charles Hotham, who would have preferred to be serving in the Crimean War, took up his commission in Victoria on 22 June 1854. He instructed Rede to introduce a strict enforcement system and conduct a weekly cycle of licence hunts, which it was hoped, would cause the exodus to the goldfields to be reversed. In August 1854, Hotham and his wife were well received in Ballarat during a tour of the Victorian goldfields. In September, Hotham imposed more frequent twice-weekly licence hunts, with more than half of the prospectors on the goldfields remaining non-compliant with the regulations.

On law enforcement in Ballarat, Carboni states that:

The miners in Bendigo responded to the increase in the frequency of licence hunts with threats of armed rebellion.

Murder of James Scobie and the burning of Bentley's Hotel 

In October 1854, the murder of James Scobie outside the Eureka Hotel and the prosecution of Johannes Gregorius was the beginning of the end for those opposed to physical force in the mining tax protest movement.  A subsequently discredited colonial inquest found no evidence of culpability by the Bentley Hotel owners for the fatal injuries, amid allegations the Magistrate D’Ewes had a conflict of interest presiding over a case involving the prosecution of Bentley, said to be a friend and indebted business partner. Gregorius, a physically disabled servant who worked for Father Smyth of St Alipius chapel, was subjected to police brutality and false arrest for licence evasion even though he was exempt from the requirement. A mass meeting of predominantly Catholic miners took place on Bakery Hill in protest over the treatment of Gregorius on 15 October. Two days later, amid the uproar over the acquittal, a meeting of approximately 10,000 men took place near the Eureka Hotel in protest. Gold receiver John Green initially tried to read the riot act but was too overawed. The hotel was set alight as Rede was pelted with eggs and the available security forces were unable to restore order.

In a despatch dated 18 November 1854, Hotham stated that:

On 21 October, arrests over the arson attack begin as Andrew McIntyre and Thomas Fletcher were taken into custody. A third man, John Westerby, was also indicted. A committee meeting of miners on Bakery Hill agreed to indemnify the bail sureties for McIntyre and Fletcher. As a large mob approached the government camp, the two men were hurriedly released under their own recognisances and whisked away to the sound of gunfire from pistols.

As if to stir the pot further, Carboni recalls that around this time, the following two reward notices were plastered around Ballarat. One offered a 500-pound reward for information leading to an arrest in the James Scobie case. The other announced the reward for more information in relation to the Bank of Victoria heist in Ballarat that was carried out by robbers wearing black crepe paper masks had been increased from 500 to 1,600 pounds. A miner's delegation was received by Rede on 23 October, who heard that the police officers involved in the arrest of Gregorious should be dismissed. Two days later, a meeting led by Timothy Hayes and John Manning heard reports from the deputies sent to negotiate with Rede. The meeting resolved to petition Hotham for a retrial of Gregorius and the reassignment of the reviled assistant commissioner Johnston away from Ballarat.

On 27 October, Captain Thomas laid contingency plans for the defence of the government outpost. In the weeks leading up to the battle, the men of violence had already been aiming musket balls at the barely fortified barracks during the night. On 30 October, Hotham appointed a board of enquiry into the murder of James Scobie, which will sit in Ballarat on the 2nd and the 10th of November. The panel included Melbourne magistrate Evelyn Sturt, assisted by his local magistrate Hackett and William McCrea. After receiving representations from the US consul, Hotham released James Tarleton from custody. The inquiry into the Ballarat rioting concluded with a statement being made on 10 November in the name of the Ballarat Reform League - which by this stage apparently had a steering committee for some weeks - that was signed by Humffray, Fredrick Vern, Henry Ross and Samuel Irwin of the Geelong Advertiser. The final report agreed with the League's submission blaming the government camp for the unsatisfactory state of affairs. The recommendation that Magistrate Dewes and Sergeant Major-Milne of the constabulary should be dismissed was duly acted upon.

Around 5,000 miners gathered in Bendigo on 1 November as a plan was drawn up to organise the diggers at all the mining settlements, as speakers openly advocating physical force addressed the crowd.

Ballarat Reform League meetings 

On 11 November 1854, a crowd of more than 10,000 gathered at Bakery Hill, directly opposite the government encampment. At this meeting, the Ballarat Reform League was formally established under the chairmanship of Chartist John Basson Humffray. Several other reform league leaders, including George Black, Henry Holyoake, and Tom Kennedy, are also believed to have been Chartists. It was reported by the Ballarat Times that at the appointed hour, the "Union Jack and the American ensign were hoisted as signals for the people to assemble."

In setting its goals, the Ballarat Reform League used the first five of the British Chartist movement's principles as set out in the People's Charter of 1838. They did not adopt or agitate for the Chartist's sixth principle, secret ballots. The meeting passed a resolution "that it is the inalienable right of every citizen to have a voice in making the laws he is called on to obey, that taxation without representation is tyranny." The meeting also resolved to secede from the United Kingdom if the situation did not improve.

Throughout the following weeks, the League sought to negotiate with Rede and Hotham on the specific matters relating to Bentley and the death of Scobie, the men being tried for the burning of the Eureka Hotel, the broader issues of the abolition of the licence, suffrage and democratic representation of the goldfields, and disbanding of the Gold Commission.

Hotham send a message to England on 16 November, which revealed his intention to establish an inquiry into goldfields grievances. Notes to the royal commissioners had already been made on 6 November, where Hotham stated his opposition to an export duty on gold replacing the universal mining tax. W.C. Haines MLC was to be the chairman, serving alongside lawmakers John Fawkner, John O'Shanassy, William Westgarth, as well as chief gold commissioner William Wright. Geoffrey Blainey has stated that: "It was perhaps the most generous concession offered by a governor to a major opponent in the history of Australia up to that time. The members of the commission were appointed before Eureka ... they were men who were likely to be sympathetic to the diggers." However, rather than hear the miners' grievances, Rede increased the police presence on the goldfields and summoned reinforcements from Melbourne. Many historians (most notably Manning Clark) attribute this to his belief in his right to exert authority over the "rabble."

The James Scobie murder trial ended on 18 November 1854, with the accused, James Bentley, Thomas Farrell and William Hance, being convicted of manslaughter and sentenced to three years of hard labour on a road crew. Catherine Bentley was acquitted. Two days later, the miners Westerby, Fletcher and McIntyre were convicted for burning the Eureka Hotel and, in turn, were sentenced to jail terms of six, four and three months. The jury recommended the prerogative of mercy be evoked and noted that they held the local authorities in Ballarat responsible for the loss of property. One week later, a reform league delegation, including Humffray, met with Hotham, Stawell and Foster to negotiate the release of the three Eureka Hotel rioters. Hotham declared that he would take a stand on the word "demand," satisfied that due process had been observed. Father Smyth informed Rede in confidence that he believed the miners may be about to march on the government outpost.

Escalating violence as military convoy looted 

Foot police reinforcements arrived in Ballarat on 19 October 1854, with a further detachment of the 40th (2nd Somersetshire) Regiment of Foot a few days behind. On 28 November, the 12th (East Suffolk) Regiment of Foot arrived to reinforce the government camp in Ballarat. As they moved alongside where the Eureka Stockade was about to be erected, there was a clash where a drummer boy John Egan and several other members of the convoy were attacked by a mob looking to loot the wagons. Tradition variously had it that Egan was either killed there and then or, alternatively, that he was the first casualty of the fighting on the day of the battle. However, his grave in Old Ballarat Cemetery was removed in 2001 as a result of research carried out by Dorothy Wickham that shows Egan actually survived and died in Sydney in 1860.

By the beginning of December, the police contingent at Ballarat had been surpassed by the number of soldiers from the 12th and 40th regiments. The strength of the various units in the government camp was: 40th regiment (infantry): 87 men; 40th regiment (mounted): 30 men; 12th regiment (infantry): 65 men; mounted police: 70 men; and the foot police: 24 men.

Paramilitary mobilisation and swearing allegiance to the Southern Cross 

On 29 November, a mass meeting involving a crowd of around 10,000 is held at Bakery Hill. The aggrieved miners heard from their deputies news of the unsuccessful outcome of their meeting with Hotham as the Eureka Flag flew over the platform for the first time. Samuel Douglas Smyth Huyghue, who lived through the rebellion, recalled it as "the symbol of the revolutionary League." The crowd was incited by Timothy Hayes shouting, "Are you ready to die?" and Fredrick Vern, who had been accused of abandoning the garrison four days later as soon as the danger arrived, with suspicions he could have been a double agent. Wesleyan minister Reverend Theophilus Taylor wrote in his diary that:

Rede responded by ordering police to conduct a provocative licence search on 30 November. There was further rioting where missiles were once again directed at military and law enforcement by the protesting miners who had henceforth refused to cooperate with licence inspections en masse. Eight defaulters were arrested, and most of the military resources available had to be summoned to extricate the arresting officers from the angry mob that had assembled.

There followed another spontaneous gathering on Bakery Hill. With none of the other leading lights in the protest movement in attendance amid the rising tide of anger and resentment amongst the miners, a more militant leader, Peter Lalor, who, at his first public appearance at the 17 November meeting, moved that a central rebel executive be formed, took the initiative and mounted a stump armed with a rifle to give a speech. Lalor proclaimed "liberty" and called for volunteers to step forward and be sworn into companies, and captains be appointed. Near the base of the flagpole, Lalor knelt with his head uncovered, pointed his right hand to the Eureka Flag and swore to the affirmation of his fellow demonstrators: "We swear by the Southern Cross to stand truly by each other and fight to defend our rights and liberties."

In a dispatch dated 20 December 1854, Hotham reported: "The disaffected miners ... held a meeting whereat the Australian flag of independence was solemnly consecrated and vows offered for its defence."

Fortification of the Eureka lead 

After the oath swearing ceremony, about 1,000 rebels marched in double file from Bakery Hill to the Eureka lead behind the Eureka Flag being carried by Henry Ross, where construction of the stockade took place between 30 November and 2 December. The stockade itself was a ramshackle affair described in Carboni's 1855 memoirs as "higgledy piggledy." There were existing mines within the stockade, and it consisted of diagonal wooden spikes made from materials including pit props and overturned horse carts. It encompassed an area said to be one acre; however, that is difficult to reconcile with other estimates that have the dimensions of the stockade as being around  x .

According to Lalor, the stockade "was nothing more than an enclosure to keep our own men together, and was never erected with an eye to military defence." However, Peter FitzSimons asserts that Lalor may have downplayed the fact that the Eureka Stockade may have been intended as something of a fortress at a time when "it was very much in his interests" to do so. The construction work was overseen by Vern, who had apparently received instruction in military methods. John Lynch wrote that his "military learning comprehended the whole system of warfare ... fortification was his strong point." Les Blake has noted how other descriptions of the stockade "rather contradicted" Lalor's recollection of it being a simple fence after the fall of the stockade. Testimony was heard at the high treason trials for the Eureka rebels that the stockade was four to seven feet high in places and was unable to be negotiated on horseback without being reduced.

Hotham feared that the "network of rabbit burrows" on the goldfields would prove readily defensible as his forces "on the rough pot-holed ground would be unable to advance in regular formation and would be picked off easily by snipers," considerations that were part of the reasoning behind the decision to move into position in the early morning for a surprise attack. Carboni details the rebel dispositions along: "The shepherds' holes inside the lower part of the stockade had been turned into rifle-pits, and were now occupied by Californians of the I.C. Rangers' Brigade, some twenty or thirty in all, who had kept watch at the 'outposts' during the night."

However, the location of the stockade has been described as "appalling from a defensive point of view," as it was situated on "a gentle slope, which exposed a sizeable portion of its interior to fire from nearby high ground." A detachment of 800 men, which included "two field pieces and two howitzers" under the commander in chief of the British forces in Australia, Major General Sir Robert Nickle, who had also seen action during the 1798 Irish rebellion, would arrive after the insurgency had been put down.

At 4 am on the morning of 1 December, the rebels were observed to be massing on Bakery Hill, but a government raiding party found the area vacated. Again Rede ordered the riot act read to a mob that had gathered around Bath's Hotel, with mounted police breaking up the unlawful assembly. Raffaello Carboni, George Black and Father Smyth meet with Commissioner Rede to present a peace proposal. Rede is suspicious of the chartist undercurrent of the anti-mining tax movement and rejects the proposals as being the way forward.

The rebels sent out scouts and established picket lines in order to have advance warning of Rede's movements. Messengers were dispatched to other mining settlements, including Bendigo and Creswick, requesting reinforcements for the Eureka Stockade. The "moral force" faction, led by Humffray, withdrew from the protest movement the previous day as the men of violence moved into the ascendancy. The rebels continued to fortify their position as 300-400 men arrived from Creswick's Creek to join the struggle. Carboni recalls they were: "dirty and ragged, and proved the greatest nuisance. One of them, Michael Tuohy, behaved valiantly." The arrival of these reinforcements required the dispatch of foraging parties, leaving a garrison of around 200 men behind. Teddy Shanahan, a merchant whose store on the Eureka lead had been engulfed by the stockade, said the rebels immediately became very short on food, drink, and accommodation and that by the evening before the battle:

Vinegar Hill blunder: Irish dimension factors in dwindling numbers at stockade 

The Argus newspaper of 4 December 1854 reported that the Union Jack "had" to be hoisted underneath the Eureka Flag at the stockade and that both flags were in possession of the foot police. Peter FitzSimons has questioned whether this contemporaneous report of the otherwise unaccounted-for Union Jack known as the Eureka Jack being present is accurate. Among those willing to credit the first report of the battle as being true and correct it has been theorised that the hoisting of a Union Jack at the stockade was possibly an 11th-hour response to the divided loyalties among the heterogeneous rebel force which was in the process of melting away. At one point up to 1,500 of 17,280 men in Ballarat were garrisoning the stockade, with as few as 120 taking part in the battle. Lalor's choice of password for the night of 2 December – "Vinegar Hill" – causing support for the rebellion to fall away among those who were otherwise disposed to resist the military, as word spread that the question of Irish home rule had become involved. One survivor of the battle stated that "the collapse of the rising at Ballarat may be regarded as mainly attributable to the password given by Lalor on the night before the assault." Asked by one of his subordinates for the "night pass," he gave "Vinegar Hill," the site of a battle during the 1798 Irish rebellion. The 1804 Castle Hill uprising, also known as the second battle of Vinegar Hill, was the site of a convict rebellion in the colony of New South Wales, involving mainly Irish transportees, some of whom were at Vinegar Hill. William Craig recalled that "Many at Ballaarat, who were disposed before that to resist the military, now quietly withdrew from the movement." In his memoirs, Lynch states: "On the afternoon of Saturday we had a force of seven hundred men on whom we thought we could rely." However, there was a false alarm from the picket line during the night. The subsequent roll call revealed there had been a sizable desertion that Lynch says "ought to have been seriously considered, but it was not." There were miners from Bendigo, Forrest Creek, and Creswick that marched to Ballarat to take part in the armed struggle. The latter contingent was said to number a thousand men, "but when the news circulated that Irish independence had crept into the movement, almost all turned back." FitzSimons points out that although the number of reinforcements converging on Ballarat was probably closer to 500, there is no doubt that as a result of the choice of password "the Stockade is denied many strong-armed men because of the feeling that the Irish have taken over." Withers states that:

It is certain that Irish-born people were strongly represented at the Eureka Stockade. Most of the rebels inside the stockade at the time of the battle were Irish, and the area where the defensive position was established was overwhelmingly populated by Irish miners. Blainey has advanced the view that the white cross of the Eureka Flag is "really an Irish cross rather than being [a] configuration of the Southern Cross."

There is another theory advanced by Gregory Blake, military historian and author of Eureka Stockade: A Ferocious and Bloody Battle, who concedes that two flags may have been flown on the day of the battle, as the miners were claiming to be defending their British rights.

In a signed contemporaneous affidavit dated 7 December 1854, Private Hugh King, who was at the battle serving with the 40th regiment, recalled that:

There was a further report in The Argus, 9 December 1854 edition, stating that Hugh King had given live testimony at the committal hearings for the Eureka rebels where he stated that the flag was found:

Blake leaves open the possibility that the flag being carried by the prisoner had been souvenired from the flag pole as the routed garrison was fleeing the stockade.

Departing detachment of Independent Californian Rangers leaves small garrison behind

Amid the rising number of rebels absent without leave throughout 2 December, a contingent of 200 Americans under James McGill arrived at 4 pm in the afternoon. Styled as "The Independent Californian Rangers' Revolver Brigade," they had horses and were equipped with sidearms and Mexican knives. In a fateful decision, McGill decided to take most of his two hundred Californian Rangers away from the stockade to intercept rumoured British reinforcements coming from Melbourne. Many Saturday night revellers within the rebel garrison went back to their own tents, assuming that the government camp would not attack on the Sabbath day. A small contingent of miners remained at the stockade overnight, which the spies reported to Rede. Common estimates for the size of the garrison at the time of the attack on 3 December range from 120-150 men.

According to Lalor's reckoning: "There were about 70 men possessing guns, 30 with pikes and 30 with pistols, but many had no more than one or two rounds of ammunition. Their coolness and bravery were admirable when it is considered that the odds were 3 to 1 against." Lalor's command was riddled with informants, and Rede was kept well advised of his movements, particularly through the work of government agents Henry Goodenough and Andrew Peters, who were embedded in the rebel garrison. Initially outnumbering the government camp considerably, Lalor had already devised a strategy where "if the government forces come to attack us, we should meet them on the Gravel Pits, and if compelled, we should retreat by the heights to the old Canadian Gully, and there we shall make our final stand." On being brought to battle that day, Lalor stated: "we would have retreated, but it was then too late."

On the eve of the battle, Father Smyth issued a plea for Catholics to down their arms and attend mass the following day.

Battle of the Eureka Stockade 

Rede planned to send the combined military police formation of 276 men under the command of Captain John Thomas to attack the Eureka Stockade when the rebel garrison was observed to be at a low watermark. The troopers planned their attack on the stockade at dawn on a Sunday – the Christian day of worship, which would be a complete surprise. The soldiers and police marched off in silence at around 3:30 am Sunday morning after the troopers had drunk the traditional tot of rum. The British commander used bugle calls to coordinate his forces. The 40th regiment was to provide covering fire from one end, with mounted police covering the flanks. Enemy contact began at approximately 150 yards as the two columns of regular infantry, and the contingent of foot police moved into position. Although Lalor claimed that the government forces fired the first shot, it appears from all the other remaining accounts as if it came from the rebel garrison.

According to Gregory Blake, the fighting in Ballarat on 3 December 1854 was not one-sided and full of indiscriminate murder by the colonial forces. In his memoirs, one of Lalor's captains, John Lynch, mentions "some sharp shooting." For at least 10 minutes, the rebels offered stiff resistance, with ranged fire coming from the Eureka Stockade garrison such that Thomas's best formation, the 40th regiment, wavered and had to be rallied. Blake says this is "stark evidence of the effectiveness of the defender's fire."

Eventually, the rebels started to run short of ammunition and the government advance resumed. The Victorian police contingent led the way over the top as the forlorn hope in a bayonet charge. Lalor had his arm shattered by a musket ball and was secreted away by supporters, with his arm later requiring amputation. The Eureka flag was captured by Constable John King, who volunteered to scale the flagpole, which then snapped. The exact number of casualties cannot be determined. After the battle, the registrar of Ballarat entered the names of 27 people into the Victorian death register. Lalor lists 34 rebel casualties, of which 22 died. In his report, Captain Thomas also states that one soldier was killed in action, two died of wounds, and fourteen were wounded.

Aftermath 
Blainey has commented that "Every government in the world would probably have counter-attacked in the face of the building of the stockade." Hotham would receive the news that the government forces had been victorious the same day, with Stawell waiting outside Saint James church, where he was attending a service with Foster. He immediately set about firing up the government printing press to put out placards calling for support from among the colonists. A state of martial law was proclaimed with no lights allowed in any tent after 8 pm "even though the legal basis for it was dubious." It was around this time that a number of unprovoked shots were fired from the government camp toward the diggings. Unrelated first-hand accounts variously state that a woman, her infant child and several men were killed or wounded in an episode of indiscriminate shooting.

News of the battle spread quickly to Melbourne and across the goldfields, turning a perceived government military victory in repressing a minor insurrection into a public relations disaster. On 5 December, reinforcements under Major General Nickle arrived at the government camp in Ballarat. Reverend Taylor expected further repression, stating that:

As it happened, Nickle proved to be a wise, considered and even-handed military commander who calmed the tensions and Taylor "found him to be a very affable and kind gentleman." Evans' diary records the effect of his conduct as follows:

The same day several thousand people attended a public meeting held in Swanston Street, Melbourne. There were howls of anger when several pro-government motions were proposed. When the seconder of one motion, which called for the maintenance of law and order, framed the issue as "would they support the flag of old England...or the new flag of the Southern Cross," the speaker was drowned out by groans from the crowd. In response, it was then proposed that restoring order required removing the government that caused the disorder in the first place. Amid cheers from the crowd, the mayor of Melbourne as chairman declared the pro-government motions carried and hastily adjourned the meeting. However, a new chairman was elected, and motions condemning the government and calling for the resignation of Foster were passed. Foster had acted as the temporary administrator of Victoria during the transition from La Trobe to Hotham. As colonial secretary to the lieutenant governor, he rigorously enforced the mining licence requirement amid the colony's budget and labour crisis. Foster had already offered his resignation on 4 December as the protests began, which Hotham accepted a week later. On 6 December 1854, a 6000-strong crowd gathered at Saint Paul's Cathedral protesting against the government's response to the Eureka Rebellion, as a group of 13 rebel prisoners are indicted for treason. Newspapers in the colony also characterised it as a brutal overuse of force in a situation brought about by the actions of government officials, and public condemnation became insurmountable. Letters Patent formally appointing the members of the Royal Commission were finally signed and sealed on 7 December 1854. Hotham nevertheless managed to have an auxiliary force of 1,500 special constables from Melbourne sworn in along with others from Geelong, with his resolve that further "rioting and sedition would be speedily put down" undeterred by the rebuff his policies had received from the general public. In Ballarat, only one man stepped forward and answered the call to enlist. By the beginning of 1855 normalcy had returned to the streets of Ballarat with mounted patrols no longer being a feature of daily life.

Hotham was promoted on 22 May 1855 when the official title of the chief executive of the colony was changed from lieutenant governor to governor. He died in Melbourne on New Year's Eve that year while in a coma after suffering from a severe cold. Although serving as a scapegoat for the government's response to the revolt at Eureka, Foster remained a member of the Legislative Council. Briefly, he served as treasurer before returning to England in 1857, where he published his speeches on the Eureka Rebellion. Rede was recalled from Ballarat and kept on full pay until 1855. He served as the sheriff at Geelong (1857), Ballarat (1868), and Melbourne (1877) and was the Commandant of the Volunteer Rifles, being the second-in-command at Port Phillip. In 1880 Rede was sheriff at the trial of Ned Kelly and an official witness to his execution.

Trials for sedition and high treason 

The first trial relating to the rebellion was a charge of sedition against Henry Seekamp of the Ballarat Times. Seekamp was arrested in his newspaper office on 4 December 1854 for a series of articles that appeared in the Ballarat Times. It has been speculated some of the offending articles were written by either John Manning, George Lang, the embezzling bank manager whose father was the prominent republican and Presbyterian Minister of Sydney, the Reverend John Dunmore Lang, or Clara Seekamp, Henry's defacto wife. Seekamp was tried and convicted of seditious libel by a Melbourne jury on 23 January 1855 and, after a series of appeals, sentenced to six months imprisonment on 23 March. He was released from prison on 28 June 1855, precisely three months early. During Seekamp's absence, Clara would serve as editor of the Ballarat Times.

Of the approximately 120 individuals detained after the battle, 13 were put on trial for high treason beginning on 22 February 1855, where matters of fact were determined by a lay jury chosen from among members of the general public who were largely sympathetic to the rebel cause. The 13 defendants were acquitted jointly and individually in seven separate trials held over two months in relation to four counts. The defendants were set to be tried in the same order as they were listed in the indictments as follows:

 Timothy Hayes, Chairman of the Ballarat Reform League, from Ireland;
 Raffaello Carboni, an Italian and trusted lieutenant who was in charge of the European diggers as he spoke a few European languages;
 John Manning, a Ballarat Times journalist from Ireland;
 John Joseph, an African American from New York City or Baltimore, United States;
 Jan Vennick, from the Netherlands;
 James Beattie, from Ireland;
 Henry Reid, from Ireland;
 Michael Tuohy, from Ireland;
 James Macfie Campbell, a man of unknown African ancestry from Kingston, Jamaica;
 William Molloy, from Ireland;
 Jacob Sorenson, a Jewish man from Scotland;
 Thomas Dignum, born in Sydney;
 John Phelan, a friend and business partner of Peter Lalor from Ireland.

However, due to pre-trial legal chicanery and the unavailability of witnesses, it was Joseph who was the first accused man to go on trial. He was one of three Americans taken into custody at the stockade, with the United States Consul intervening to secure the release of the other two detainees. There were two privates from the 40th regiment that testified they saw Joseph fire a double-barreled shotgun and, by implication, that he inflicted the fatal wounds sustained by Captain Wise.

Butler Cole Aspinall, who appeared pro bono as junior counsel for Joseph, was formerly chief of parliamentary reporting for The Argus before returning to practice and was elected to the Legislative Assembly in the wake of the Eureka trials. He would receive many other criminal briefs later in his legal career, including that of Henry James O’Farrell, who was indicted for an 1868 assassination attempt on the Duke of Edinburgh in Sydney. Gavan Duffy said of Aspinall that he was: "one of the half-dozen men whose undoubted genius gave the Parliament of Victoria a first place among colonial legislatures."

The prosecution was handled by Attorney-General William Stawell representing the Crown before Chief Justice William à Beckett. As Molony points out, the legality of putting a foreign national on trial for treason had been settled as far back as 1649. However, the difficulty the Crown prosecutor faced was that:

The jury deliberated for about half an hour before returning a verdict of "not guilty." The Argus reported that "A sudden burst of applause arose in the court," but it was instantly checked by court officers. The Chief Justice condemned this as an attempt to influence the jury, as it could be construed that a jury could be encouraged to deliver a verdict that would receive such applause; he sentenced two men (identified by the Crown Solicitor as having applauded) to a week in prison for contempt. Over 10,000 people had come to hear the jury's verdict. Joseph was carried around the streets of Melbourne in a chair in triumph, according to The Ballarat Star.

Manning's case was the next to be heard. The remaining trials were then presided over by Victorian Chief Justice Redmond Barry, with all the other accused men being acquitted in quick succession except Dignum, whose indictment was withdrawn nolle prosequi. The remaining five were all tried together on 27 March. The lead defence counsel Archibald Michie observed that the proceedings had become "weary, stale, flat, dull and unprofitable." The trials have, on several occasions, been described as a farce. The Colonial Secretary Lord John Russell rebuked Hotham over the decision to prosecute the captured rebels, saying in a despatch:

Commission of Inquiry report 
On 14 December 1854, the goldfields commission sat for the first time. The first Ballarat session is held four days later at Bath's Hotel. In a meeting with Hotham on 8 January 1855, the goldfields commissioners made an interim recommendation that the mining tax be scrapped, and two days later made a submission advising a general amnesty be granted in relation to all those persons criminally liable for their part in the Eureka Rebellion.

The final report of the Royal Commission into the Victorian goldfields was presented to Hotham on 27 March 1855. It was scathing in its assessment of all aspects of the administration of the goldfields, particularly the Eureka Stockade affair. Within 12 months, all but one of the demands of the Ballarat Reform League is implemented. The changes included the abolition of gold licences to be replaced with an export duty. An annual 1-pound miner's right that entitles the holder to voting rights for the lower house and a land deed is introduced. Mining wardens replaced the gold commissioners, and there was a reduction in police numbers. The Legislative Council was reconstituted to provide representation for the major gold field settlements.

In relation to the tensions caused by the Chinese presence on the goldfields, the report states inter alia:

The legislative remedy came in the form of a poll tax, assented to on 12 June 1855, made payable by Chinese immigrants.

Humffray commended the report in a letter to the editor, saying:

Peter Lalor enters parliament

Lalor, in his letter to the colonists of Victoria, lamented that:

In July 1855, the Victorian Constitution received royal assent, which provided for a fully elected bicameral parliament with a new Legislative Assembly of 60 seats and a reformed Legislative Council of 30 seats. The franchise was available to all holders of the miner's right for the inaugural Legislative Assembly election with members of parliament themselves subject to property qualifications. In the interim, five representatives from the mining settlements were appointed to the old part elected Legislative Council, including Lalor and Hummfray in Ballarat.

Lalor is said to have "aroused hostility among his digger constituents" by not supporting the principle of one vote, one value. He instead preferred the existing property-based franchise and plural voting, where ownership of a certain number of holdings conferred the right to cast multiple ballots. In the event when the Electoral Act of 1856 (Vic) was enacted, these provisions were not carried forward, and universal adult male suffrage was then introduced in 1857 for Legislative Assembly elections. On another occasion, there were 17,745 signatures from Ballarat residents on a petition against a regressive land ownership bill Lalor supported that favoured the "squattocracy," who came from pioneering families who had acquired their prime agricultural land through occupation and were not of a mind to give up their monopoly on the countryside, nor political representation. He is on record as having been opposed to payment for members of the Legislative Council, which had been another key demand of the Ballarat Reform League. In November 1855, under the new constitutional arrangements, Lalor was elected unopposed to the Legislative Assembly for the seat of North Grenville, which he held from 1856 to 1859.

Withers and others have noted that those who considered Lalor a legendary folk hero were surprised that he should be more concerned with accumulating styles and estates than securing any gains from the Eureka Rebellion. Lalor had been found out as wanting by a critical mass of his supporters, who had hitherto sustained his political career. Lynch recalls that:

Under pressure from constituents to clarify his position, in a letter dated 1 January 1857 published in the Ballarat Star, Lalor would describe his political ideology in the following terms:

From there on, he never represented a Ballarat-based constituency again, successfully contesting the Melbourne seat of South Grant in the Legislative Assembly in 1859 until being twice defeated at the polls in 1871, on the second occasion contesting the seat of North Melbourne. In 1874 he was once again elected as the member for South Grant, which he represented in parliament until he died in 1889.

Lalor served as chairman of committees from 1859 to 1868 before being sworn into the ministry. He was first appointed as Commissioner of Trade and Customs in 1875, an office he also held throughout 1877-1880, riding the fortunes of his parliamentary faction. He was also briefly Postmaster-General of Victoria from May to July 1877. Lalor would go on to serve as the speaker from 1880 and 1887. When his health situation forced him to step down, parliament awarded him a sum of 4,000 pounds. Lalor is said to have twice refused to accept the highest Imperial honour of a British knighthood.

Political legacy
The actual political significance of the Eureka Rebellion is not decisive. It continues to raise echoes to the present day, and from time to time one group or another calls for the official Australian national flag to be replaced by the Eureka Flag. It has been variously interpreted as a revolt of free men against imperial tyranny, of independent free enterprise against burdensome taxation, of labour against a privileged ruling class, or as an expression of republicanism. Some historians believe that the prominence of the event in the public record has come about because Australian history does not include a major armed rebellion phase equivalent to the French Revolution, the English Civil War, or the American War of Independence, making the Eureka story inflated well beyond its real importance. Others, however, maintain that Eureka was a seminal event and that it marked a major change in the course of Australian history.

In his eyewitness account, Carboni stated that "amongst the foreigners ... there was no democratic feeling, but merely a spirit of resistance to the licence fee." He also disputes the accusations "that have branded the miners of Ballarat as disloyal to their QUEEN."

American author Mark Twain, who journeyed to Ballarat, mentioned the Eureka Rebellion in his 1897 travel book Following the Equator saying:

H.V. Evatt, leader of the ALP, wrote that "Australian democracy was born at Eureka." Liberal Prime Minister Robert Menzies said "the Eureka revolution was an earnest attempt at democratic government." Ben Chifley, former ALP Prime Minister, expressed the view that:

Blainey has described Evatt's view as "slightly inflammatory" for such reasons as the first parliamentary elections in Australian history actually took place in South Australia, albeit according to a more limited property-based franchise, acknowledging that:

He has also drawn attention to the fact that many miners were temporary migrants from Britain and the United States who did not intend to settle permanently in Australia, saying:

In 1999, the Premier of New South Wales, Bob Carr, dismissed the Eureka Stockade as a "protest without consequence." Deputy Prime Minister John Anderson made the Eureka Flag a federal election campaign issue in 2004 saying "I think people have tried to make too much of the Eureka Stockade ... trying to give it a credibility and standing that it probably doesn't enjoy." In the opening address of the Eureka 150 Democracy Conference in 2004, the Premier of Victoria, Steve Bracks, said "that Eureka was about the struggle for basic democratic rights. It was not about a riot – it was about rights."

Commemoration

19th century
Following an earlier meeting on 22 November 1855 held at the location of the stockade where calls for compensation were made, Carboni returned to the rebel burial ground for the first anniversary of the battle and remained for the day selling copies of his self-published memoirs. The following year for the second anniversary, veteran John Lynch gave a speech as several hundred people gathered at the Eureka lead and the local cemetery to remember the fall of the Eureka Stockade.

A diggers' memorial was erected in the Ballaarat Old Cemetery on 22 March 1856 near marked graves. Sculpted in stone from the Barrabool Hills by James Leggatt in Geelong, it features a pillar bearing the names of the deceased miners and bearing the inscription "Sacred to the memory of those who fell on the memorable 3 December 1854 in resisting the unconstitutional proceedings of the Victorian Government."

The soldiers were also buried in the same cemetery as the rebels. In August 1872, the area surrounding the soldiers' graves was enclosed with a fence. A soldiers' memorial was constructed in 1879 and is an obelisk constructed of limestone sourced from Waurn Ponds with the words "Victoria" and "Duty" carved in its north and south faces, respectively.

The Eureka Stockade Memorial located within the Eureka Stockade Gardens dates from 1884 and has been added to the Australian National Heritage List.

Over the next thirty years, press interest in the events that had taken place at the Eureka Stockade dwindled, but Eureka was kept alive at the campfires and in the pubs and at memorial events in Ballarat. In addition, key figures such as Lalor and Humffray were still in the public eye.

Some of the earliest recorded examples of the Eureka Flag being used as a symbol of white nationalism and trade unionism are from the late 19th century. According to an oral tradition, the Eureka Flag was on display at a seaman's union protest against the use of cheap Asian labour on ships at Circular Quay in 1878. In August 1890, the Eureka Flag was draped from a platform in front of a crowd of 30,000 protesters assembled at the Yarra Bank in Melbourne in a show of solidarity with maritime workers. There was also a similar flag flown prominently above the camp at Barcaldine during the 1891 Australian shearers' strike.

In 1889, Melbourne businessmen employed renowned American cyclorama artist Thaddeus Welch, who teamed up with local artist Izett Watson to paint a  canvas of the Eureka Stockade, wrapped around a wooden structure. When it opened in Melbourne, the exhibition was an instant hit. The Age reported in 1891 that "it afforded a very good opportunity for people to see what it might have been like at Eureka." The Australasian stated "that many persons familiar with the incidents depicted, were able to testify to the fidelity of the painted scene." The people of Melbourne flocked to the cyclorama, paid up and had their picture taken before it. Eventually, it was dismantled and disappeared from sight.

20th century

For the 50th anniversary in 1904, around sixty veterans gathered for a reunion at the Eureka Stockade memorial with large crowds in attendance. According to one report, there was a procession and "much cheering and enthusiasm along the line of route, and the old pioneers received a very hearty greeting." The crowd heard from a number of speakers, including Ballarat-born Richard Crouch MP, who "was not at all satisfied that the necessity for revolt had at all ended; in fact, he rather advocated a revolt against conventionalism and political cant."

In 1954 a committee of Ballarat locals was formed to coordinate events to mark the centenary of the Eureka Stockade. Geoffrey Blainey, who was in Ballarat at the time, recalls attending one function and finding that no one, apart from a small group of communists, was there. There are also reports of an oration at the Peter Lalor statue, a procession, a pageant at Sovereign Hill, a concert and dance, a dawn service, and a pilgrimage to the Eureka graves. Evidently, the procession was headed by mounted police and servicemen from the Royal Australian Airforce base at Ballarat dressed in 1850s soldier's uniforms. There were centenary commemoration events around Australia held under the auspices of the Communist Party of Australia, which in the 1940s named their youth organisation the Eureka Youth League. Catholic Church affiliates also endorsed a Eureka centenary supplement with commemorative events.

Ballarat's best-known tourist destination, Sovereign Hill, was opened on 29 November 1970 as an open-air museum set in the gold rush period. Since 1992 in commemoration of the Eureka Stockade Sovereign Hill has featured a 90-minute son et lumière "Blood Under the Southern Cross," a sound and light show attraction played under the night skies that was revised and expanded from 2003. The Eureka Flag was temporarily on display at Sovereign Hill during 1987, whilst renovation work was being carried out at the Art Gallery of Ballarat.

In 1973, Gough Whitlam gave a speech to mark the largest and most celebrated fragments of the Eureka Flag donated by the descendants of John King going on permanent display to the general public at the Art Gallery of Ballarat. He predicted that: "an event like Eureka, with all its associations, with all its potent symbolism, will acquire an aura of excitement and romance, and stir the imagination of the Australian people."

A purpose-built interpretation centre was erected at the cost of $4 million in March 1998 in the suburb of Eureka near the Eureka Stockade memorial. Designed to be a new landmark for Ballarat, it was known as the Eureka Stockade Centre and then the Eureka Centre. The building originally featured an enormous sail emblazoned with the Eureka Flag. Before its development there was considerable debate over whether a replica or reconstruction of wooden structures was appropriate. However, it was eventually decided against, and this is seen by many as a reason for the apparent failure of the centre to draw significant tourist numbers. Due primarily to falling visitor numbers the "controversial" Eureka Centre was redeveloped between 2009 and 2011. In 2013 it was relaunched as the Museum of Australian Democracy at Eureka with the aid of a further $5 million in funding from both the Australian and Victorian governments and $1.1 million from the City of Ballarat. The centrepiece of MADE's collection was the "King" fragments of the Eureka Flag made available on loan from the Art Gallery of Ballarat, that represent 69.01% of the original specimen. In 2018, the City of Ballarat council resolved to assume responsibility for managing the facility. MADE was closed and since being reopened has been called the Eureka Centre Ballarat.

21st century

In 2004, the 150th anniversary of the Eureka Stockade was commemorated. In November, the Premier of Victoria Steve Bracks announced that the Ballarat V/Line rail service would be renamed the Eureka Line to mark the 150th anniversary taking effect from late 2005 at the same time as the renaming of Spencer Street railway station to Southern Cross, however, the proposal was criticised by community groups including the Public Transport Users Association. Renaming of the line did not go ahead. However, the redesignation of the Spencer Street Station was announced on 13 December 2005. Bracks stated that the change would resonate with Victorians because the Southern Cross "stands for democracy and freedom because it flew over the Eureka Stockade." An Australian postage stamp featuring the Eureka Flag was released along with a set of commemorative coins. A ceremony in Ballarat known as the lantern walk was held at dawn. However, Prime Minister John Howard did not attend any commemorative events and refused to allow the Eureka Flag to fly over Parliament House.

The Eureka Tower in Melbourne, completed in 2006, is named in honour of the rebellion and features symbolic aspects such as blue glass and white stripes in reference to both the Eureka Flag and a surveyor's measuring staff and a crown of gold glass with a red stripe to represent the blood spilled on the goldfields.

In 2014 to mark the 160th anniversary of the Eureka Rebellion the Australian Flag Society released a commemorative folk cartoon entitled Fall Back with the Eureka Jack that was inspired by the Eureka Jack mystery.

On 1 June 2022, the City of Ballarat, in conjunction with Eureka Australia, unveiled a new Pathway of Remembrance at the Eureka Stockade Memorial Park commemorating the "35 men who lost their lives during the Eureka Stockade in 1854."

Popular culture

The Eureka Rebellion has been the inspiration for numerous novels, poems, films, songs, plays and artworks. Much of the Eureka folklore relies heavily on Raffaello Canboni's 1855 book, The Eureka Stockade, which was the first and only comprehensive eyewitness account of the Eureka rebellion. Henry Lawson wrote a number of poems about Eureka, as have many novelists. There have been four motion pictures based on the uprising in Ballarat. The first was Eureka Stockade, which was a silent film made in 1907, being only the second feature film produced in Australia. There have also been a number of plays and songs about the rebellion. The folk song German Teddy concerns Edward Thonen, one of the rebels who dies defending the Eureka Stockade.

See also 
 Castle Hill convict rebellion
 Darwin Rebellion
 Eureka Flag
 History of Victoria
 Rum Rebellion

Notes

References

Bibliography

Historiography

General histories

Surveys of the period

Local histories

Popular histories

Pictorial histories

Narrative histories

Military histories

Social histories

Political histories

Feminist histories

Other specialised studies

Biography

Battlefield archaeology

Vexiollology

Primary sources

Memoirs

 
 
 
 Huyghue, Samuel Douglas Smyth The Ballarat Riots, 1854 held at the Mitchell Library, Sydney.
 
 Nicholls, H.R (May 1890). Reminiscences of the Eureka Stockade. The Centennial Magazine: An Australian Monthly. II: August 1889 to July 1890 (available in an annual compilation).
 R.E. Johns Papers, MS10075, Manuscript Collection, La Trobe Library, State Library of Victoria.

Diaries

 Evans, Charles, diary, 24 September 1853 – 21 January 1855, SLV, MS 11484, Box 1777/4 (formerly known as the "Samuel Lazarus" diary).
 Pierson, Thomas, diary, SLV, MS 11646, Box 2178/4-5.
 Taylor, Theophilus, diary, 23 September 1853 – 1 August 1856, Ballarat Genealogy Society.

Affidavits

Official reports

Other contemporaneous reports

The Argus

The Geelong Advertiser and Intelligencer

The Kyogle Examiner

Daily Mercury

Other documents

 Ballarat Reform League Charter, 11 November 1854, VPRS 4066/P Unit 1, November no. 69, VA 466 Governor (including Lieutenant Governor 1851–1855 and Governor's Office), Public Record Office Victoria.

Reference books

Journals

Historical magazines

Other media reports

Seminars

Interviews

Speeches

Compilations

Further reading 
 Eureka on Trial - Public Record Office Victoria
 Eurekapedia
 Eureka Stockade timeline - State Library of Victoria
 Eureka Stockade - Australian Government
 Heretic Press - Ballarat 3rd Dec 1854
 The Australian Gold Rush - Australian Government
 The Eureka Flag, 1854 NSW Migration Heritage Centre statement of historical significance
 The Eureka Rebellion  Radical nationalist database
 150th Anniversary of the Eureka Stockade - Official site

External links 

 Art Gallery of Ballarat
 Ballarat and District Genealogical Society
 Ballarat Heritage Services
 Ballarat Historical Society
 Ballarat Reform League Inc.
 Eureka Australia
 Eureka Centre Ballarat
 Public Record Office Victoria
 Sovereign Hill/Gold Museum
 State Library of Victoria
 The C.J. La Trobe Society

1854 in Australia
1855 in Australia
19th-century rebellions
History of Ballarat
Australian folklore
History of Victoria (Australia)
19th century in Victoria (Australia)
Riots and civil disorder in Victoria (Australia)
Rebellions against the British Empire
Rebellions in Australia
Political history of Australia
Protests in Australia
History of Australia (1851–1900)
19th-century reform movements
1854 riots
Conflicts in 1854
Resistance to colonialism in Australia
Chartism
December 1854 events